Jeff Hart may refer to:

 Jeffrey Hart (1930–2019), American writer and academic
 Jeffrey A. Hart (born 1947), professor of political science
 Jeff Hart (gridiron football) (born 1953), American football player
 Jeff Hart (Love of Life), character of the soap opera Love of Life
 Jeff Hart (golfer) (born 1960), American professional golfer

See also
Jeffery Hart Bent (1781–1852), Australian jurist